RusRating is a credit rating agency located in Russia founded in 2001. In 2013 Kommersant said it was the smallest in the country, with about 30 customers, about 4 percent of the market.

In October 2012, Dagong Global Credit Rating stated that they will cooperate with Egan-Jones Ratings Company and RusRating to form a joint venture called Universal Credit Rating Group.
The Universal Credit Rating Group will be located in Hong Kong, and starts working in 6 months since the agreement. The joint venture will also give countries credit ratings. Managing director of Egan-Jones Ratings Bill Hassiepen told that the three rating agencies will not merge, but will participate in a strategic alliance. The three companies services will market together but will work singly he said.

On June 25, 2013, a new international rating agency, Universal Credit Rating Group, was launched jointly by Rus-Rating, Dagong Global Credit Rating and Egan-Jones Ratings. The agency positions itself as an alternative to the "big three" Fitch Ratings, Standard & Poor's and Moody's. The headquarters of the company is located in Hong Kong.

In December 2013, the founder of Rus-Rating Richard Hainsworth and partners sold 100% of the company's shares to Alexander Zaitsev, who previously held senior positions in Sberbank CIB, Troika Dialog and Uralsib Capital Management.

In March 2015, the former deputy head of the Moscow Main Territorial Department of the Central Bank of the Russian Federation Sergey Ablyaev became the owner of 51% of the company's shares.

In March 2016, Dmitry Lyubinin, the owner of the leasing company CJSC Business Alliance, acquired 100% of the company's shares.

Ownership of the agency changed hands twice in 2015-2016 and shortly afterwards it closed.

References

External links
Official website 
 	

Credit rating agencies in Russia
Companies based in Moscow